The May Seventh Cadre Schools were Chinese labor camps established during the Cultural Revolution that combined hard agricultural work with the study of Mao Zedong's writings in order to "re-educate" or laogai (reform through labor) cadres and intellectuals in proper socialist thought.

Further reading

Memoirs 

 Yang Jiang:《干校六记》- Six Chapters from My Life "Downunder", tr. Howard Goldblatt (University of Washington Press, 1988).

Fiction 

 Cao Wenxuan, Bronze and Sunflower, tr. Helen Wang (Walker Books, UK, 2015; Candlewick Press, USA, 2017).

Propaganda posters 
 May Seventh Cadre Schools in Chinese propaganda posters.

References

Cultural Revolution
Penal labor in China
1966 establishments in China
Penal system in China
1979 disestablishments in China